Fula may refer to:
Fula people (or Fulani, Fulɓe)
Fula language (or Pulaar, Fulfulde, Fulani)
The Fula variety known as the Pulaar language
The Fula variety known as the Pular language
The Fula variety known as Maasina Fulfulde
Al-Fula

Language and nationality disambiguation pages